The Victim is a 1916 American silent drama film that was written and directed by Will S. Davis. The film starred Valeska Suratt and Herbert Heyes, and was distributed by Fox Film Corporation. All prints are believed to be lost.

Cast
Valeska Suratt as Ruth Merrill
Herbert Heyes as Dr. Boulden
Claire Whitney as Edna Boulden
John Charles as Jack Higgins
Joseph Granby as Roy Barker
Oscar Nye as Dugan
Charles Edwards as Doc Burns

See also
1937 Fox vault fire

References

External links

1916 films
Fox Film films
Films directed by Will S. Davis
Lost American films
American silent feature films
American black-and-white films
1916 drama films
Silent American drama films
1916 lost films
Lost drama films
1910s American films
1910s English-language films